Jamal Thomas Boykin (born April 27, 1987) is an American former professional basketball player. He played one full season of college basketball for Duke University before transferring to the University of California, Berkeley for his sophomore season. After completing his college career in 2010, Boykin began his professional career in Turkey. He went on to spend the majority of his professional career in Europe and Japan, but had a stint in New Zealand in 2014, where he earned league All-Star Five honors.

High school career
Boykin attended Fairfax High School in Los Angeles, where he won numerous awards as a sophomore, junior and senior. As a sophomore in 2002–03, he named state Sophomore Player of the Year after registering 16 points and 10 rebounds per game. As a junior in 2003–04, he earned California High School Sports Junior Player of the Year honors. That season, he shot .766 from the field and averaged 19.5 points and 11.4 rebounds per game while leading Fairfax to the California state championship. He also had 103 assists, 97 blocked shots and 63 steals as a junior.

In November 2004, Boykin signed a National Letter of Intent to play college basketball for Duke University.

As a senior in 2004–05, Boykin was named the Gatorade State Player of the Year in California after averaging 22 points, 12 rebounds, four blocked shots and five assists for Fairfax. He was also named third-team Parade All-American and was the John Wooden Award winner for the city Player of the Year in Los Angeles.

College career

Duke (2005–2006)
As a freshman at Duke in 2005–06, Boykin saw action in 26 games and averaged 1.0 points and 0.8 rebounds per game. He played eight minutes against Seton Hall in the NIT Season Tip-Off for his collegiate debut, scoring four points and grabbing a pair of offensive rebounds. He later made an appearance against LSU in the Sweet 16 of the NCAA Tournament. He played in three games as a sophomore in 2006–07 before being diagnosed with mono in late November 2006. The following month, he left Duke for medical reasons and informed head coach Mike Krzyzewski that he would not be returning. Boykin realized that he couldn't provide the team with 100 percent on the practice court and also wanted to pursue a bigger role with a different program.

California (2007–2010)
On December 15, 2006, Boykin committed to the California Golden Bears for the 2007–08 season.

Sophomore year
Boykin made a dramatic impact on Cal's lineup upon becoming eligible to play on December 22, 2007 against Utah. After scoring two points in six minutes in his debut for the Bears, he came through with 18 points and 10 boards in 19 minutes in his next game against Long Beach State, making 8-of-11 shots from the floor, including both of his three-point attempts. On January 31, 2008, in a game against Washington State, he earned his first of 11 starts in 2007–08. He tied his career high with 18 points in the regular-season finale at UCLA. He later came off the bench in Cal's two NIT games, chipping in 10 points and five rebounds against New Mexico, and seven points against Ohio State. In 25 games as a sophomore, he averaged 7.8 points, 3.8 rebounds and 1.2 assists per game.

Junior year
As a junior in 2008–09, Boykin started all 33 games and made his presence felt both on the boards, as he was Cal's leading rebounder all season. He led the Bears in rebounds with a total of 211 (6.4 rpg) and 120 in conference games, and was fourth in scoring on the team at 9.6 points per game. His shooting percentage of .529 (129–244) was also the best on the team. He recorded five double-doubles during the season and tallied a career-high 22 points against Stanford.

Senior year
As a senior in 2009–10, Boykin earned second-team All-Pac-10 honors after averaging career highs in points (11.9) and rebounds (6.7) per game. He started all 35 games for the Bears and had eight double-doubles on the season, 14 for his career, after posting 13 points and 11 rebounds against Duke in the NCAA Tournament. He set a career high in scoring with 25 points against Arizona State. At the conclusion of the season, his career field-goal percentage of 54.7 ranked fourth all-time in school history.

Professional career

2010–11 season
After going undrafted in the 2010 NBA draft, Boykin signed with Turkish team Gaziantepspor in August 2010. In 17 games for Gaziantepspor in 2010–11, he averaged 17.5 points, 7.3 rebounds and 1.0 steals per game.

2011–12 season
In September 2011, Boykin signed with Omonia BC of Cyprus for the 2011–12 season. In February 2012, he left Omonia and signed with the Iwate Big Bulls of Japan for the rest of the season. He averaged 13.5 points in eight games for Omonia, and in 24 games for Iwate, he averaged 10.7 points, 6.9 rebounds and 1.2 assists per game.

2012–13 season
In July 2012, Boykin signed with Dutch team GasTerra Flames for the 2012–13 season. In 42 games for the Groningen-based team, he averaged 12.7 points, 6.0 rebounds, 1.9 assists and 1.1 steals per game.

2013–14 season
On September 7, 2013, Boykin signed with s.Oliver Baskets of Germany for the 2013–14 season. He appeared in three games for s.Oliver Baskets before parting ways with them in early November. On November 28, 2013, he signed a two-month deal with New Yorker Phantoms Braunschweig. The next day, however, he was released after failing physicals.

In December 2013, Boykin signed with Ukrainian team Cherkaski Mavpy for the rest of the season. However, due to the growing threats of unrest in the country, he took an opportunity to leave the Ukraine in March 2014. On March 8, he signed with the Nelson Giants for the 2014 New Zealand NBL season. Four days later, he played his final game for Cherkaski. In 13 games for the Ukrainian side, he averaged 10.8 points, 7.1 rebounds and 1.5 assists per game.

Boykin arrived in Nelson, New Zealand on March 19, 2014. Two days later, he travelled with the Giants to Porirua for the NBL's Pre-season Blitz tournament. On April 4, 2014, he made his debut for the Giants in their season opening loss to the Wellington Saints. In 34 minutes of action, he recorded 23 points and eight rebounds. On May 23, he recorded a season-high 35 points and 11 rebounds in a 91–82 win over the Manawatu Jets. He subsequently earned Player of the Week honors for Round 8. He helped the Giants finish the regular season in third place on the ladder with an 11–7 record. In their semi-final match-up with the second-seeded Wellington Saints on July 4, the Giants were defeated 89–71, knocking them out of the playoffs. Boykin struggled in the game, as he recorded just six points on 2-of-11 shooting. His impressive regular season earned him a spot in the NBL All-Star Five. He appeared in all 19 games for the Giants in 2014, averaging 20.3 points, 7.7 rebounds and 1.4 assists per game.

2014–15 season
In August 2014, Boykin signed with BG Göttingen of Germany for the 2014–15 season. In 31 games for Göttingen, he averaged 8.1 points and 3.5 rebounds per game.

2015–16 season
In August 2015, Boykin signed with the Sendai 89ers of Japan for the 2015–16 season. In 55 games for Sendai, he averaged 17.7 points, 10.3 rebounds, 3.4 assists and 1.0 steals per game.

2016–17 season
In July 2016, Boykin signed with the Shinshu Brave Warriors of Japan for the 2016–17 season. In December 2016, he left Shinshu and signed with Basketball Löwen Braunschweig of the German Basketball Bundesliga for the rest of the season. In 23 games for Shinshu, he averaged 11.0 points, 6.1 rebounds and 1.7 assists per game. In 18 games for Braunschweig, he averaged 9.1 points, 3.1 rebounds and 1.0 assists per game.

Personal
Boykin is the son of Ruben Sr. and Mary. His older brother, Ruben Jr., played college basketball at Northern Arizona, where he was a three-time All-Big Sky selection; he then played overseas for 11 seasons. He also has two older sisters, Desi and Serena. His wife, Isri, is a model and a web designer.

References

External links
Jamal Boykin at rizemanagement.com
Jamal Boykin at goduke.com
Jamal Boykin at calbears.com
Jamal Boykin at b-warriors.net 

1987 births
Living people
American expatriate basketball people in Cyprus
American expatriate basketball people in Germany
American expatriate basketball people in Japan
American expatriate basketball people in New Zealand
American expatriate basketball people in the Netherlands
American expatriate basketball people in Turkey
American expatriate basketball people in Ukraine
American men's basketball players
Basketball players from Los Angeles
BC Cherkaski Mavpy players
BG Göttingen players
California Golden Bears men's basketball players
Centers (basketball)
Duke Blue Devils men's basketball players
Iwate Big Bulls players
Nelson Giants players
Parade High School All-Americans (boys' basketball)
Power forwards (basketball)
S.Oliver Würzburg players
Sendai 89ers players
Shinshu Brave Warriors players